"D4L" (an acronym for Down 4 Life) is a song recorded by American singer Sevyn Streeter featuring singer and producer The-Dream. The song was released as the third single on October 14, 2016 through Atlantic Records.

Critical reception
The song was met with mixed reviews received by critics. HotNewHipHop said in a review "Sevyn Streeter continues to roll out new music in support of her forthcoming album Girl Disrupted, which is expected to arrive early next year. After hitting us with “Prolly” with Gucci Mane & “All My Love (My Love For You)” recently, Sevyn decides to keep it moving by dropping off another leak for us today called “D4L” featuring singer/songwriter The Dream." That Grape Juice described the song as a "racy track finds Sevyn in familiar territory – the bedroom. Tuck into the pulsating production after the jump… ‘D4L’ fuses the right dose of breeze and banger to make for a track that can be played in the club and in the car – top down."

Music video
The audio video for "D4L" was released to Streeter's YouTube channel on October 13, 2016. The music video was released to YouTube on October 16, 2016.

Track listings and formats

Release history

References

2016 singles
2016 songs
Sevyn Streeter songs
Atlantic Records singles
Songs written by The-Dream
Songs written by Tricky Stewart
Song recordings produced by The-Dream